The FIS Snowboarding World Championships is the world championship organized by the FIS for Snowboarding. It was first held in 1996 and is now held every odd year. The championship events include Big air, Halfpipe, Parallel giant slalom, Parallel slalom, Slopestyle and Snowboard cross for both genders as well as mixed team events in Parallel slalom and Snowboard cross.

Host cities

* Starting from 2015, it combined with the FIS Freestyle World Ski Championships.
** Only freestyle ski events.

Men's results
Bold numbers in brackets denotes record number of victories in corresponding disciplines.

Alpine

Parallel slalom

Medal table

Giant slalom

Medal table

Slalom

Medal table

Parallel giant slalom

Medal table

Freestyle

Halfpipe

Medal table

Big air

Medal table

Slopestyle

Medal table

Snowboard cross

Snowboard cross

Medal table

Team snowboard cross

Medal table

Women's results
Bold numbers in brackets denotes record number of victories in corresponding disciplines.

Alpine

Parallel slalom

Medal table

Giant slalom

Medal table

Slalom

Medal table

Parallel giant slalom

Medal table

Freestyle

Halfpipe

Medal table

Slopestyle

Medal table

Big air

Medal table

Snowboard cross

Snowboard cross

Medal table

Team snowboard cross

Medal table

Mixed results

Team snowboard cross

Medal table

Team parallel slalom

Medal table

Medal table
Table updated after the 2023 Championships.

Multiple medalists
Boldface denotes active snowboarders and highest medal count among all snowboarders (including these who not included in these tables) per type.

Men

Women

See also
 FIS Snowboarding World Cup
 Snowboarding at the Winter Olympics
 List of Olympic medalists in snowboarding
 FIS Snowboarding Junior World Championships

References

 
Snowboarding competitions
Snowboard
Snowboard